John Hailey (August 29, 1835 – April 10, 1921) was a Congressional Delegate from Idaho Territory.

He was born in Smith County, Tennessee, and attended the public schools. Of Scottish ancestry, his grandfather, Philip Hailey, and his father, John Hailey, were both natives of Virginia. His father married Miss Nancy Baird, a native of Tennessee, the daughter of Captain Josiah Baird, who had been a captain in the War of 1812.

He moved in 1848 to Missouri with his parents, who settled in Dade County. Hailey crossed the plains emigrating to Oregon in 1853. He enlisted as a private on the outbreak of the Rogue River Indian War in 1855 and was subsequently promoted to lieutenant. John married Louisa M. Griffin on August 7, 1856 in Jackson County, Oregon, and they would have six children including Thomas G. Hailey who would serve in the Oregon Supreme Court. He moved to Washington Territory in 1862 and engaged in agricultural pursuits, stock raising, and mining.

Hailey was elected mayor of Boise, Idaho Territory, in 1871 but never took office.

Hailey was elected as a Delegate to the Forty-third Congress (March 4, 1873 – March 3, 1875).
He declined to be a candidate for renomination in 1874. He served as member of the Territorial council of Idaho in 1880 and served as its president.

In 1884, Hailey was elected to the Forty-ninth Congress (March 4, 1885 – March 3, 1887), but was an unsuccessful candidate for reelection in 1886 to the Fiftieth Congress.

He was appointed warden of the Idaho State Penitentiary in 1899. In 1907, upon the founding of the Historical Society of the State of Idaho – now the Idaho State Historical Society – Hailey was made its first Secretary and Librarian. While Secretary and Librarian in 1910, at the request of the Legislature, Mr. Hailey wrote a history of the state.

He died in Boise, Idaho, April 10, 1921 and was interred in the Masonic Burial Ground. The city of Hailey is named in his honor.

In 1958, he was inducted into the Hall of Great Westerners of the National Cowboy & Western Heritage Museum.

Sources

1835 births
1921 deaths
Members of the Idaho Territorial Legislature
19th-century American politicians
Delegates to the United States House of Representatives from Idaho Territory
United States Army officers
Rogue River Wars
People from Smith County, Tennessee
Idaho Democrats